Amir Hossein Firouzpour is an Iranian freestyle wrestler.

in 2022, Firouzpour won the gold medal in the 92 kg event at 2022 World Junior Wrestling Championships held in Sofia, Bulgaria. He won gold medal at 2022 Asian Wrestling Championships in the 92 kg event held in Ulaanbaatar, Mongolia. He also won gold medal at 2022 U23 World Wrestling Championships in category 92 kg held in Pontevedra, Spain.

His brother, Mohammad Sadegh is wrestler too.

References

External links 
 
 

Living people
People from Juybar
Iranian male sport wrestlers
Sportspeople from Mazandaran province
20th-century Iranian people
21st-century Iranian people
Year of birth missing (living people)